Edible salts, also known as table salts, are generally derived from mining (rock salt) or evaporation (including sea salt). Edible salts may be identified by such characteristics as their geographic origin, method of preparation, natural impurities, additives, flavourings, or intended purpose (such as pickling or curing).

References

Salts